The women's 400 metres event at the 1985 IAAF World Indoor Games was held at the Palais Omnisports Paris-Bercy on 19 January.

Results

References

400
400 metres at the World Athletics Indoor Championships